Nehatu Nature Reserve is a nature reserve in Pärnu County, Estonia. Its area is 1185.5 ha.

The protected area was formed in 1957 when Nehatu Bog was taken under protection.

Protected species:
 Haliaeetus albicilla
 Circus aeruginosus
 Grus grus
 Cladium mariscus.

References

Nature reserves in Estonia
Geography of Pärnu County
Tourist attractions in Pärnu County